Kiskadden is a surname. Notable people with the surname include:

Asaneth Ann Adams Kiskadden (1847–1916), American actress
Maude Ewing Adams Kiskadden (1872–1953), American actress

Scottish surnames